Warren Run is a stream in the Noble County, Ohio.

Warren Run was named for William Warren, a pioneer who settled there in the late 1810s.

See also
List of rivers of Ohio

References

Rivers of Noble County, Ohio
Rivers of Ohio